The Superliga 2 de Voleibol Femenina (SF-2), is the second category league of Spanish Volleyball, under the Superliga Femenina de Voleibol. The administration of the league is carried out by the Real Federación Española de Voleibol.

Champions by year

See also
Superliga Femenina de Voleibol
Superliga de Voleibol Masculina
Superliga 2 de Voleibol Masculina

External links
Superliga Femenina 2
Winners by year
  Spanish Superliga 2.women.volleybox.net 

Spain women2

Women's volleyball competitions in Spain
Spain
Women's sports leagues in Spain